WCNM (103.9 FM, "Radio Cantico Nuevo") is a radio station licensed to Hazlet, New Jersey, broadcasting a Spanish language Christian radio format. The station is currently owned by Cantico Nuevo Ministry, Inc. and serves the Monmouth County, New Jersey area.

On July 27, 2015, WVRM, Inc. filed an assignment of license application with the Federal Communications Commission for a transfer of license to Cantico Nuevo Ministry, Inc. the owner of Radio Cantico Nuevo. The sale, at a purchase price of $130,000, was consummated on November 25, 2015.

See also
Radio Cantico Nuevo is also heard on these stations.

 WNYG licensed to Patchogue, New York
 WJDM licensed to Mineola, New York

References

External links

CNM
Radio stations established in 1979
1979 establishments in New Jersey